Peringalam is a small town in Talassery taluk of Kannur district in the Indian state of Kerala. It is part of Panoor municipality. Peringalam assembly constituency was part of Vatakara (Lok Sabha constituency) until 2011.

References

Villages in Kannur district